Camille T. Dungy (born 1972) is an American poet and professor.

Career
Born in Denver, Colorado, Dungy graduated from Stanford University (BA) and the University of North Carolina, Greensboro, where she earned her MFA.

She is the author of four poetry collections – Trophic Cascade (Wesleyan University Press, 2016), Smith Blue (Southern Illinois University Press, 2011), Suck on the Marrow (Red Hen Press, 2010) and What to Eat, What to Drink, What to Leave for Poison (Red Hen Press, 2006) – as well as a recent collection of essays entitled Guidebook to Relative Strangers (W.W. Norton, 2017). Dungy is editor of Black Nature: Four Centuries of African American Nature Poetry (UGA, 2009), co-editor of From the Fishouse: An Anthology of Poems that Sing, Rhyme, Resound, Syncopate, Alliterate, and Just Plain Sound Great (Persea, 2009), and assistant editor of Gathering Ground: A Reader Celebrating Cave Canem’s First Decade (University of Michigan Press, 2006). Her poems have appeared in literary journals and magazines, including The American Poetry Review, Poetry, Callaloo, The Missouri Review, Crab Orchard Review, Poetry Daily. She is also a contributor to Margaret Busby's 2019 anthology New Daughters of Africa.

Dungy's honors include fellowships from the National Endowment for the Arts, the Virginia Commission for the Arts, and the Bread Loaf Writers' Conference, Cave Canem, the American Antiquarian Society, and the Sewanee Writers' Conference, and she is the recipient of the 2011 American Book Award, a 2010 California Book Award silver medal, a two-time recipient of the Northern California Book Award, and a two-time NAACP Image Award nominee. Recently a professor in the Creative Department at San Francisco State University (2011–2013), she is currently a professor in the English Department at Colorado State University. In 2019, Dungy was awarded a Guggenheim Fellowship for her poetry.

Awards
 2019: Guggenheim Fellowship
2013: Sustainable Arts Foundations Promise Award
 2011: American Book Award
 2011: California Book Award Silver Medal
 2011: Northern California Book Award
 2010: Crab Orchard Open Poetry Series
 2010: Northern California Book Award
 2007: Dana Award in Poetry
 2003: National Endowment for the Arts Fellowship

Published works
Full-length poetry collections
 Trophic Cascade, Wesleyan University Press, 2016
 Smith Blue, Southern Illinois University Press, 2011
 Suck on the Marrow, Red Hen Press, 2010
 What to Eat, What to Drink, What to Leave for Poison, Red Hen Press, 2006

Essays
 Guidebook to Relative Strangers, W.W. Norton, 2017

Editor
 Black Nature: Four Centuries of African American Nature Poetry, University of Georgia Press, 2009
 
 

Anthologies
 Lucille Lang Day and Ruth Nolan (eds.), Fire and Rain: Ecopoetry of California. Scarlet Tanager Books, 2018
 Melissa Tuckey (ed.), Ghost Fishing: An Eco-Justice Poetry Anthology.  University of Georgia Press, 2018
 Charles Rowell (ed.),Angles of Ascent: A Norton Anthology of Contemporary African American Poetry, New York: W. W. Norton, 2013
 Anne Fisher-Wirth and Laura-Gray Street (eds), The Ecopoetry Anthology, Trinity University Press, 2013. 
 Joshua Corey and G. C. Waldrep (eds), The Arcadia Project, Ahsahta Press, 2012
 New California Writing. Heyday Books, 2012
 Emily Rosko and Anton VanderZee (eds), A Broken Thing: Poets on the Line. The University of Iowa Press, 2011
 Alison Deming and Lauret Savoy (eds), The Colors of Nature: Culture, Identity, and the Natural World. Minneapolis, MN: Milkweed Editions, 2011
  Nikki Giovanni (ed.), The 100 Best African American Poems. Sourcebooks: 2010
  Julie Greicius and Elissa Bassist (eds), Rumpus Women, Vol. I, The Rumpus Book Club, 2010
 The Place That Inhabits Us: Poems from the San Francisco Bay Watershed. San Francisco, CA: Sixteen Rivers Press, 2010

References

External links

 Official website
 "Camille T. Dungy", Kenyon Review interview
 Audio Reading: Camille Dungy Reading, From the Fishouse
 Interview with Dungy on Words on a Wire
 Poems: 
 Black Nature: Poems Of Promise And Survival - audio report by NPR

1972 births
Living people
Stanford University alumni
San Francisco State University faculty
University of North Carolina at Greensboro alumni
Writers from San Francisco
American women poets
American Book Award winners
21st-century American poets
21st-century American women writers
21st-century African-American writers
African-American women writers
Writers from Denver